Dolichothrips is a genus of thrips in the family Phlaeothripidae.

Species
 Dolichothrips amygdali
 Dolichothrips assimilis
 Dolichothrips chikakoae
 Dolichothrips citripes
 Dolichothrips confusus
 Dolichothrips crassusensus
 Dolichothrips eriae
 Dolichothrips fialae
 Dolichothrips franae
 Dolichothrips fumipennis
 Dolichothrips fuscipes
 Dolichothrips indicus
 Dolichothrips longicollis
 Dolichothrips macarangai
 Dolichothrips malhavii
 Dolichothrips montanus
 Dolichothrips ochripes
 Dolichothrips reuteri
 Dolichothrips utae
 Dolichothrips varipes
 Dolichothrips zyziphi

References

Phlaeothripidae
Thrips
Thrips genera